Thomas Hörbiger (1931–2011) was a German film actor and lyricist. He was the son of the actor Paul Hörbiger. His daughter is the actress Mavie Hörbiger. Hörbiger co-wrote Austria's winning entry at the 1966 Eurovision Song Contest, which was sung by Udo Jürgens.

Selected filmography
 The Doctor's Secret (1955)
 Emperor's Ball (1956)
 The Winemaker of Langenlois (1957)
 Love, Girls and Soldiers (1958)
 The Street (1958)

References

Bibliography
 Barclay, Simon. The Complete & Independent Guide to the Eurovision Song Contest 2014.

External links

1931 births
2011 deaths
German male film actors
Male actors from Berlin